"Big Time" is a song by American producer DJ Khaled featuring American rappers Future and Lil Baby. It was sent to rhythmic contemporary radio on November 1, 2022 as the second single from the Khaled's thirteenth studio album God Did (2022).

Critical reception
The song was met with a generally negative reception from music critics. Ben Brutocao of HipHopDX considered it among the tracks from God Did that "holds this project firmly back." Dani Blum of Pitchfork wrote, "Even Lil Baby can't resuscitate 'Big Time' from a plodding beat and the absurdity of Future's very first line: 'Rainbow Audemars 'cause my bitch bisexual.'"

Music video
The official music video was released on August 26, 2022. It opens with DJ Khaled in a bubble bath, surrounded by "scantily clad beauties". One woman fans him with a palm frond and another feeds him grapes. When Khaled demands his butler to bring him a towel, another one of them appears only to remove the tray cover. Most of the clip sees Khaled, Future and Lil Baby on a lawn of a large mansion while in the company of women in bikinis, some of whom are lounging by the pool. All three artists wear a Royal Oak in the video.

Charts

References

2022 singles
2022 songs
DJ Khaled songs
Future (rapper) songs
Lil Baby songs
Song recordings produced by DJ Khaled
Songs written by DJ Khaled
Songs written by Future (rapper)
Songs written by Lil Baby
Songs written by TM88
Epic Records singles